Govind Ballal Kher (1710 - 17 December 1760), historically known as Govind Pant Bundela, was a Military General of Peshwas in Northern India during 1733 to 1760. Peshwa Bajirao appointed him his trustee for the 1/3 kingdom rewarded to him by Maharaja Chhatrasal in Bundelkhand. He ruled the city of Kalpi and later it was given as jagir to his descendant Nana Govinda Rao. After this Govind Rao ruled the Jalaun State.

Early life
Govind Pant was born in a Karhade Brahmin family in village ‘Nevare’ in Ratnagiri district of Maharashtra in or around 1710. His father was Kulkarni of the village and Govind Pant inherited this post on early death of his father. Being a vagabond, however, he was forced to leave the post and also his native place and was compelled to wander in the search of a job.

Career
In the beginning of his career, he worked under the established Maratha Generals of North India Malharrao Holkar and Antaji Mankeshwar Gandhe and got good experience of guerilla war and administration.
On recommendation by the Deshastha Brahmin Antaji, Bajirao Peshwa assigned some jobs to Govind Pant and found him extremely useful. Soon he became Bajirao’s one of the most favorite.
When Bajirao got Bundelkhand from Maharaja Chhatrasal in 1733, he appointed Govindpant as his Administrator and Power of attorney for this newly annexed land.

He was always known to be the greatest ‘Fund raiser’ of the Maratha Empire.

Contribution to the Battle of Panipat
Govind Pant did his best to help the Maratha army under the leadership of Sadashivrao Bhau during Battle of Panipat. He himself had trapped Ahmed Shah Abdali in the region between Ganges and Yamuna (termed as Duab) and had made him totally helpless. But when he got the opportunity he delivered a considerable  amount at Delhi to Naro Shankar and started attacking the supplies of Ahmad Shah Abdali. Unfortunately however, a sheer misunderstanding led him to lose his life in an unexpected tussle with the troops under Abdali’s General Ataikhan.

Controversy
Veteran historian V K Rajwade holds Govind Pant responsible for the defeat of Marathas in the Third Battle of Panipat. Also he does not consider him as a man of importance. Moreover, he accuses him to be always corrupt. Whereas according to Shuresh Sharma, "It was Balaji Bajirao's love of pleasure which was responsible for loss in Panipat. He delayed at Paithan celebrating his second marriage until December 27, when it was too late."

References

 ‘Marathi Riyasat Volume I’ (Marathi) by Govind Sakharam Sardesai
 ‘Peshwyanchi Bakhar’ (Marathi) Editorial Notes by R.V.Herwadkar
 ‘Bhausahebachi Bakhar’ (Marathi) Editorial Notes by R.V.Herwadkar
 'Aitihasik Prastavana' (Marathi) by V K Rajwade
 'Third Battle of Panipat' by Abhas Verma  Bharatiya Kala Prakashan

People from Maharashtra
Year of birth uncertain
People from Ratnagiri district
People from Sagar, Madhya Pradesh
1761 deaths